Tina Stevenson is a former association football player who represented New Zealand at international level.

Stevenson made just two appearances for the Football Ferns, both 0-0 draws with Korea Republic, her début on 8 September 1995 and her second appearance 2 days later.

References

Year of birth missing (living people)
Living people
New Zealand women's association footballers
New Zealand women's international footballers
Women's association footballers not categorized by position